This list of Narcissus species shows the accepted species names within the genus Narcissus, which are predominantly spring perennial plants in the Amaryllidaceae (amaryllis) family. Various common names including daffodil, narcissus, and jonquil are used to describe all or some members of the genus. The list of species is arranged by subgenus and section. Estimates of the number of species in Narcissus have varied widely, from anywhere between 16 and nearly 160, even in the modern era. Carl Linnaeus originally included six species in 1753.

Much of the variation lies in the definition of species, and whether closely related taxa are considered separate species or subspecies. Thus, a very wide view of each species, such as Webb's results in few species, while a very narrow view such as that of Fernandes results in a larger number. Another factor is the status of hybrids, given natural hybridisation. There is a distinction between what are referred to as 'ancient hybrids' which are found occurring over a relatively large area, and 'recent hybrids' with a more restricted range and found growing as solitary plants amongst their parents. The former are more often considered as separate species.

Fernandes (1951) accepted 22 species, on which were based the 27 species listed by Webb in the 1980 Flora Europaea. By 1968, Fernandes had accepted 63 species, and by 1990 Blanchard listed 65 species, and Erhardt 66 in 1993. In 2006 the International Daffodil Register listed 87 species. In contrast, the genetic study by Zonneveld (2008) resulted in only 36 species (for list and comparison with Webb, see Zonneveld Table 4).

, the World Checklist of Selected Plant Families accepts 52 species, along with at least 60 hybrids. Another important source is the Royal Horticultural Society's Botanical Classification  and list of botanical names (October 2014) which is the basis of their International Daffodil Register. This is a searchable list and had 81 accepted names in its October 2014 release.

Table of Narcissus species
Over 300 synonymous species names are listed, reflecting wide variations in how the genus is divided into species. These have been arranged into Sections. These should not be confused with the horticultural classification of cultivars into divisions by the Royal Horticultural Society

Sections (with type species) shown are according to Zonneveld (2008). In addition Mathew (2002) further divides the sections into subsections.

 Apodanthi (N. calcicola)
 Bulbocodium (N. bulbocodium)
 Ganymedes (N. triandrus)
 Jonquillae (N. jonquilla)
 Juncifolii (N. assoanus)
 Narcissus (N. poeticus)
 Nevadensis (N. nevadensis)
 Pseudonarcissus (N. pseudonarcissus)
 Tapeinanthus (N. cavanillesii) 
 Serotini (N. serotinus)
 Tazettae (N. tazetta)

For a list of species by Section according to the Royal Horticultural Society, see the RHS Botanical Classification (updated September 2013), which is the basis of their International Daffodil Register.

{| class="wikitable" border="1"

!style="border-top:solid black 4px; background: #ccf"|Name||style="border-top:solid black 4px; background: #ccf"|Authority||style="border-top:solid black 4px; background: #ccf"|Common name||style="border-top:solid black 4px; background: #ccf"|Image||style="border-top:solid black 4px; background: #ccf"|Distribution
|-
| colspan=5 style="border-bottom: 3px solid black;"|Subgenus Hermione (Haw.) Spach.Type species: N. tazetta
|-
|colspan=5 style="border-bottom: 3px solid grey;"|Section Aurelia (Gay) BakerNarcissus broussonetii (incorporated into Tazettae, 2008)
|-
| colspan=5|Section Serotini Parlatore
|-
|Narcissus obsoletussyn. N. miniatus||(Haw.) SpachDonnison-Morgan, Koopowitz & Zonneveld|| ||||West, north and eastMediterranean basinMap
|-
|style="border-bottom: 3px solid grey;"|Narcissus serotinusType species||style="border-bottom: 3px solid grey;"|L.||style="border-bottom: 3px solid grey;"| ||style="border-bottom: 3px solid grey;"|||style="border-bottom: 3px solid grey;"|Spain, NW AfricaAdditional map
|-
| colspan=4|Section Tazettae de Candolle
|-
|Narcissus broussonetii||Lag. y Seg.|| ||||North AfricaMap
|-
|Narcissus dubius||Gouan|| ||||NW Spain, S FranceAdditional map
|-
|Narcissus elegans||(Haw.) Spach|| ||Image || West MediterraneanMap
|-
|Narcissus papyraceussyn. N. barlae||Ker Gawl.Parlatore||Paperwhite||||NW Africa, west andnorth MediterraneanAdditional map
|-
|style="border-bottom: 4px solid black;"|Narcissus tazettaType species ||style="border-bottom: 4px solid black;"|L.||style="border-bottom: 4px solid black;"| ||style="border-bottom: 4px solid black;"|||style="border-bottom: 4px solid black;"|Mediterranean basin,Middle EastMap
|-
| colspan=5 style="border-bottom: 3px solid black;"|Subgenus Narcissus L.Type species: N. poeticus|-
| colspan=5|Section Apodanthi A.Fernandes
|-
|Narcissus albimarginatus||D.Müll.-Doblies & U.Müll.-Doblies|| ||Image  ||MoroccoMap
|-
|Narcissus calcicolaType species||Mendonça|| ||||
|-
|Narcissus rupicolasyn. N. atlanticus||Dufour ex Schult.f.Stern || ||||Portugal, Spain, MoroccoAdditional map
|-
|Narcissus scaberulus||Henriq.|| ||Image ||
|-
|colspan=5 style="border-bottom: 3px solid grey;"|PreviouslyN. cuatrecasasii Fern.Casas (moved to Jonquillae)
|-
| colspan=5|Section Bulbocodium de Candolle 
|-
|Narcissus bulbocodiumType species||L.|| Hoop-petticoat daffodil||||France, SpainMap
|-
|Narcissus cantabricus ||DC.||White Hoop-petticoat Daffodil||||Spain, NW AfricaAdditional map
|-
|Narcissus foliosus||(Maire) Fern.Casas|| ||Image ||MoroccoMap
|-
|Narcissus hedraeanthus||(Webb & Heldr.) Colmeiro|| ||||
|-
|Narcissus nivalis||Graells|| ||Image||Spain, PortugalMap
|-
|Narcissus obesus||Salisb.|| ||||
|-
|Narcissus romieuxii ||Braun-Blanq. & Maire|| ||||MoroccoMap
|-
|colspan=5 style="border-bottom: 3px solid grey;"|Doubtful
 Narcissus hesperidis Fern.Casas
 Narcissus jeanmonodii Fern.Casas
 Narcissus tingitanus Fern.Casas
|-
|colspan=5|  Section Ganymedes (Haworth) Schultes f.
|-
|Narcissus lusitanicus||Dorda & Fern. Casas|| ||||PortugalMap
|-
|Narcissus pallidulussyn. N. cernuus||GraellsSalisb.|| ||Image||Spain, PortugalMap
|-
|style="border-bottom: 3px solid grey;"|Narcissus triandrusType species||style="border-bottom: 3px solid grey;"|L.||style="border-bottom: 3px solid grey;"|Angel's-tears||style="border-bottom: 3px solid grey;"|||style="border-bottom: 3px solid grey;"|France, Spain, PortugalMap
|-
| colspan=5|Section Jonquilla de Candolle 
|-
|Narcissus blanchardiisyn. N. flavus||Zonn. stat. nov.Lag.|| || Image ||Portugal, SpainMap
|-
|Narcissus cuatrecasasii||Fern.Casas, Lainz & Ruiz Rejon|| ||||Spain, MoroccoAdditional map
|-
|Narcissus jonquillaType species||L.||JonquilRush daffodil||||
|-
|style="border-bottom: 3px solid grey;"|Narcissus viridiflorus ||style="border-bottom: 3px solid grey;"|Schousb.||style="border-bottom: 3px solid grey;"| ||style="border-bottom: 3px solid grey;"|||style="border-bottom: 3px solid grey;"|Gibraltar, MoroccoMap
|-
|colspan=5| Section Juncifolii (A. Fern.) Zonn. sect nov.
|-
|Narcissus assoanusType species||Dufour||Rush-leaf jonquil ||| ||E Spain, S FranceAdditional map
|-
|style="border-bottom: 3px solid grey;"|Narcissus gaditanus||style="border-bottom: 3px solid grey;"|Boiss. & Reuter||style="border-bottom: 3px solid grey;"| ||style="border-bottom: 3px solid grey;"|||style="border-bottom: 3px solid grey;"|
|-
| colspan=5|Section Narcissus L. 
|-
|style="border-bottom: 3px solid grey;"|Narcissus poeticusType species||style="border-bottom: 3px solid grey;"|L.||style="border-bottom: 3px solid grey;"|Poet's Narcissus||style="border-bottom: 3px solid grey;"| ||style="border-bottom: 3px solid grey;"|Central EuropeMap
|-
| colspan=5|Section Nevadensis Zonn. sect. nov 
|-
|Narcissus bujei||Fern. Casas||||Image ||S Spain
|-
|Narcissus longispathus||Pugsley|| ||||S SpainMap
|-
|style="border-bottom: 3px solid grey;"|Narcissus nevadensisType species||style="border-bottom: 3px solid grey;"|Pugsley||style="border-bottom: 3px solid grey;"| ||style="border-bottom: 3px solid grey;"|||style="border-bottom: 3px solid grey;"|
|-
|colspan=5| Section Pseudonarcissus de CandolleTrumpet daffodils
|-
|Narcissus abscissus||(Haw.) Roem. & Schult.f.|| ||Image ||Spain, S FranceAdditional map
|-
|Narcissus asturiensis||(Jord.) Pugsley|| ||||N Spain, PortugalMap
|-
|Narcissus cyclamineus||DC.||Cyclamen-flowered Daffodil||||Portugal, NW SpainMap
|-
|Narcissus jacetanus||Fern.Casas|| ||||NE SpainMap 
|-
|Narcissus moleroi||Fern.Casas|| ||Image  ||
|-
|Narcissus primigenius||(Fern.Suárez ex M.Laínz) Fern.Casas & Laínz|| ||Image ||
|-
|Narcissus pseudonarcissusType species||L.||Wild Daffodil|| || W. EuropeMap
|-
|colspan=5 style="border-bottom: 3px solid grey;"|Previously
 N. alcaracensis syn. N. longispathus N. confusus Pugsley syn. N. pseudonarcissus N. hispanicus Gouan syn. N. pseudonarcissus (Spanish Daffodil)
 N. longispathus (moved to Nevadensis)
 N. minor syn. N. pseudonarcissus (Lesser Wild Daffodil)
 N. moschatus syn. N. pseudonarcissus (White Daffodil)
 N. nevadensis Pugsley (moved to Nevadensis)
 N. obvallaris syn. N. pseudonarcissus (Tenby Daffodil)
 N. radinganorum Fern. Casas syn. N. pseudonarcissus|-
|colspan=5| Section Tapeinanthus (Herbert) Traub
|-
|style="border-bottom: 3px solid black;"|Narcissus cavanillesii||style="border-bottom: 3px solid black;"|Barra & G.López||style="border-bottom: 3px solid black;"| ||style="border-bottom: 3px solid black;"|||style="border-bottom: 3px solid black;"|Portugal, Spain, NW AfricaAdditional map
|}

 Intersectional hybrids (Nothospecies)
 Narcissus x alleniæ Donnison-Morgan (N. obsoletus × N. viridiflorus) 
 Narcissus x obsoletus (Haw.) Spach (N. elegans × N. serotinus) Narcissus × medioluteus syn. N. biflorus''

See also
 Taxonomy of Narcissus
 List of Narcissus horticultural divisions
 List of AGM narcissus - species and cultivars which have won the RHS Award of Garden Merit
 List of Narcissus species (Spanish version)

Notes

References

Works cited

Books

 
 
 
 
 
 
  In 
 
 , in

Articles

Websites

Further reading

 List
Narcissus